Jean Rabier (16 March 1927 – 15 February 2016) was a French cinematographer who frequently worked with director Claude Chabrol. He had almost 70 film credits spanning a career from 1961–1991.

He died on 15 February 2016 at the age of 88.

Selected filmography
 Madame Bovary (1991)
 Dr. M (1990)
 Jours tranquilles à Clichy (Quiet Days in Clichy) (1990)
 Une affaire de femmes (Story of Women) (1988)
 Le Cri du hibou (The Cry of the Owl) (1987)
 Masques (Masks) (1987)
 Inspecteur Lavardin (1986)
 Poulet au vinaigre (Chicken with Vinegar) (1985)
 Les Fantômes du chapelier (The Hatters's Ghost) (1982)
 Le Cheval d'orgueil (The Proud Ones / The Horse of Pride) (1980)
 Violette Nozière (Violette) (1978)
 Les Liens de sang (Blood Relatives) (1978)
 Alice ou la dernière fugue (Alice / Alice or The Last Escapade) (1977)
 Folies bourgeoises (The Twist) (1976)
 Les Magiciens (Death Rite) (1976)
 Les Innocents aux mains sales (Dirty Hands / Innocents with Dirty Hands) (1975)
 Une partie de plaisir (A Piece of Pleasure / Pleasure Party) (1975)
 Nada (The Nada Gang) (1974)
 Les Noces rouges (Wedding in Blood) (1973)
 Docteur Popaul (Scroundel in White / High Heels / Play Now, Play Later) (1972)
 La Décade prodigieuse (Ten Days Wonder) (1971)
 Juste avant la nuit (Just Before Nightfall) (1971)
 Cold Sweat (1970)
 La Rupture (The Breach / Hallucination / The Breakup) (1970)
 Le Boucher (The Butcher) (1970)
 Que la bête meure (This Man Must Die) (1969)
 La Femme infidèle (The Unfaithful Wife) (1969)
 Les Biches (The Does / Bad Girls / Girlfriends) (1968)
 La Route de Corinthe (The Road to Corinth) (1967)
 Le Scandale (The Champagne Murders) (1967)
 La Ligne de démarcation (Line of Demarcation) (1966)
 Le Tigre se parfume à la dynamite (An Orchid for the Tiger / Our Agent Tiger) (1965)
 Marie-Chantal contre le docteur Kha (Marie-Chantal vs. Doctor Kha) (1965)
 Paris vu par... (Six in Paris) (segment La Muette) (1965)
 Le Tigre aime la chair fraîche (Code Name: Tiger / The Tiger Likes Fresh Meat) (1964)
 Les parapluies de Cherbourg (The Umbrellas of Cherbourg) (1964)
 Les Plus Belles Escroqueries du monde (The World's Most Beautiful Swindlers) (segment L'Homme qui vendit la tour Eiffel) (1964)
 Ophélia (1963)
 La Baie des Anges (Bay of Angels) (1963) 
 Landru (Bluebeard) (1963)
 L'Œil du Malin (The Eye of Evil) (1962)
 Cléo de 5 à 7 (Cléo from 5 to 7) (1962)
 Les Sept Péchés capitaux (The Seven Deadly Sins) (segment L'Avarice) (1962)
 Les Godelureaux (Wise Guys) (1961)
 Le Beau Serge (Handsome Serge / Bitter Reunion) (1958) — also with Henri Decaë

References

External links

1927 births
2016 deaths
Cinematographers from Paris